A hammer mill is a mill whose purpose is to shred or crush aggregate material into smaller pieces by the repeated blows of little hammers. These machines have numerous industrial applications, including:

 Ethanol plants (grains)
 A farm machine, which mills grain into coarse flour to be fed to livestock
 Fluff pulp defiberizing
 Fruit juice production
 Grinding used shipping pallets for mulch
 Milling grain
 Livestock, poultry, and aquatic feed production
 Sawmills, size reduction of trim scrap and planer shavings into boiler fuel or mulch

 Shredding paper
 Shredding scrap automobiles (see automotive shredder residue)
 Shredding yard and garden waste for composting
 Crushing large rocks
 In waste management

Operation
The basic principle is straightforward. A hammer mill is essentially a steel drum containing a vertical or horizontal rotating shaft or drum on which hammers are mounted. The hammers are free to swing on the ends of the cross, or fixed to the central rotor. The rotor is spun at a high speed inside the drum while material is fed into a feed hopper. The material is impacted by the hammer bars and is thereby shredded and expelled through screens in the drum of a selected size.

The hammermill can be used as a primary, secondary, or tertiary crusher.

Small grain hammermills can be operated on household current. Large hammer mills used in automobile shredders may be driven by diesel or electric motors ranging from 2000 to over 5000 horsepower (1.5 - 3.7MW).

The screenless hammer mill uses air flow to separate small particles from larger ones. It is designed to be more reliable, and is also claimed to be much cheaper and more energy efficient than regular hammermills.
The design & structure of the hammermill is always determined by the end use.

History
Water-powered trip hammer mills were created in 488 AD by the medieval Chinese mathematician and engineer Zu Chongzhi which was inspected by Emperor Wu of Southern Qi (r. 482–493 AD). The water-powered trip hammer mills were powered by minor hill flowing stream that was connected to a large river beneath the high banks.

Types of Hammer Mill Crushers
Types of Hammer Mill Crushers can include "up running" and "down running" hammer mills - 

 "Up Running" - Uses perforated screens or grate bars to reduce soft or hard materials. The material to be reduced determines the rotor construction that can be adjustable based on wear.
 "Down Running" - Most suitable for fibrous materials due to the high concentration of shearing action within the unit.
Based on the director of the motor the hammer mills are classified into the following types:

 Reversible hammer mill
 Non-reversible hammer mill

Although the mills are classified into the above two different types their working and grinding actions of both these types of mill are almost similar. However, their construction differs in various respects.

See also
 Blade grinder
 Trip hammer, which may be housed in a mill usually known as a forge, but which was historically occasionally described as a “hammermill.”

References 

hammer mills
Chinese inventions